The 2014 Internacional Femenil Monterrey was a professional tennis tournament played on outdoor hard courts. It was the second edition of the tournament which was part of the 2014 ITF Women's Circuit, offering a total of $50,000 in prize money. It took place in Monterrey, Mexico, on 6–12 October 2014.

Singles main draw entrants

Seeds 

 1 Rankings as of 29 September 2014

Other entrants 
The following players received wildcards into the singles main draw:
  Carolina Betancourt
  Ximena Hermoso
  Victoria Rodríguez
  Marcela Zacarías

The following players received entry from the qualifying draw:
  Melinda Czink
  Vanesa Furlanetto
  Valeria Savinykh
  Patricia Maria Țig

Champions

Singles 

  An-Sophie Mestach def.  Lourdes Domínguez Lino, 6–3, 7–5

Doubles 

  Lourdes Domínguez Lino /  Mariana Duque def.  Elise Mertens /  Arantxa Rus, 6–3, 7–6(7–4)

External links 
 2014 Internacional Femenil Monterrey at ITFtennis.com
 Official website

2014
2014 ITF Women's Circuit
2014 in Mexican tennis